Chrysoula Anagnostopoúlou (born 27 August 1991 in Larissa) is a Greek discus thrower. She competed at the 2015 World Championships in Beijing without qualifying for the final.

Her personal best in the event is 62.40 meters set in Irakleio on June 4, 2022.

Competition record

References

1991 births
Living people
Greek female discus throwers
World Athletics Championships athletes for Greece
Athletes (track and field) at the 2016 Summer Olympics
Olympic athletes of Greece
Athletes (track and field) at the 2013 Mediterranean Games
Athletes (track and field) at the 2018 Mediterranean Games
Mediterranean Games bronze medalists for Greece
Mediterranean Games medalists in athletics
Athletes (track and field) at the 2020 Summer Olympics
Athletes from Larissa
20th-century Greek women
21st-century Greek women